"Di Ko Lang Masabi" (English: "I Just Can't Say") is the debut single of actress, beauty queen and Pinoy Big Brother: Lucky 7 2nd lucky big placer, Kisses Delavin. The song was first heard in MOR 101.9 on October 4, 2017 but the single was officially released two days later. The song was under Star Records label will be part of Delavin's first self-titled album.

Track listing

References

2017 songs
2017 debut singles
Philippine pop songs
Star Music singles
Tagalog-language songs